A Big Family (translit. Bolshaya semya) is a 1954 Soviet drama film directed by Iosif Kheifits. It was entered into the 1955 Cannes Film Festival. It was based on Vsevolod Kochetov's novel Zhurbiny.

Cast
 Sergei Lukyanov as Matvei Zhurbin
 Boris Andreyev as Ilya Matveyevich Zhurbin
 Vera Kuznetsova as Agafya Karpovna Zhurbina
 Aleksey Batalov as Aleksei Zhurbin
 Sergei Kurilov as Victor Zhurbin
 Vadim Medvedev as Anton Zhurbin
 Boris Bityukov as Kostya Zhurbin
 Iya Arepina as Tanya Zhurbina
 Klara Luchko as Lida Zhurbina
 Ekaterina Savinova as Dunyasha Zhurbina
 Pavel Kadochnikov as Skobelev
 Elena Dobronravova as Katya Travnikova
 Nikolai Gritsenko as Club Manager
 Nikolai Sergeyev as Basmanov
 Larisa Kronberg as Zinaida Ivanova

Accolades
 1955 – 1955 Cannes Film Festival – Special prize for best acting ensemble.

References

External links

1954 films
1950s Russian-language films
1954 drama films
Films directed by Iosif Kheifits
Lenfilm films
Soviet drama films